Congregation B'nai Israel is a Reform Jewish synagogue located in Bridgeport, Connecticut. It is the oldest Jewish congregation in Bridgeport and the third oldest in Connecticut.
B'nai Israel was established by a group of German Jewish immigrants as an Orthodox synagogue in 1859. The congregation's first rabbi was A. Jacobs. B'nai Israel established a Hebrew school in 1863.

For its first fifty years, B'nai Israel did not have a permanent home. Its members met and prayed in one another's homes and in storefronts and lofts. In 1885, plans were made to erect a building for B'nai Israel. The building, which was completed in 1911, was known as the Park Avenue Temple.

By 1911, when the Park Avenue Temple was completed, B'nai Israel had moved from Orthodox to Reform Judaism. Members who were unhappy with the changes left B'nai Israel and founded two of Bridgeport's other synagogues: Adath Israel (Orthodox) and Rodeph Sholom (Conservative).

After World War II, B'nai Israel outgrew its building and a second structure, called the Second Park Avenue Temple, was erected, designed by the prolific synagogue architect Percival Goodman. Goodman commissioned artist Larry Rivers to create a Torah ark cloth for the new building, but Rivers' design was ultimately rejected and his work ended up in the collection of the Jewish Museum in New York City.

In 2002, the temple drew attention (including an article in The New York Times) after its large junior choir, directed by Cantor Sheri Blum, recorded a CD with Cantor Bruce Benson entitled The Rock Service, Featuring Cantor Bruce Benson and the Jazz Service. This album was described as combining "original rock music with liturgically accurate chants," and was reportedly in contention for a Grammy nomination. (Benson, later the cantor at Congregation Beth Israel (Scottsdale, Arizona), also recorded a jazz service with Kenny G.)

In 2009 the temple, having recently renovated and expanded its building, celebrated its 150th anniversary. As of 2009, 700 families belong to Congregation B'nai Israel and approximately 400 students are enrolled in its religious school.

Notable congregants
Craig Breslow, a major league baseball player, and his family attended Congregation B'nai Israel.

References

External links

Reform synagogues in Connecticut
Buildings and structures in Bridgeport, Connecticut
Culture of Bridgeport, Connecticut
German-American culture in Connecticut
German-Jewish culture in the United States
Religious organizations established in 1859
1859 establishments in Connecticut
1958 establishments in Connecticut
Synagogues completed in 1958
Percival Goodman synagogues